Panoquina hecebolus, the hecebolus skipper, is a species of grass skipper in the butterfly family Hesperiidae. It is found in North America.

The MONA or Hodges number for Panoquina hecebolus is 4120.

References

Further reading

 

Panoquina
Articles created by Qbugbot